August William Swentor (November 21, 1899 – November 10, 1969) was a pinch hitter in Major League Baseball. He played one game for the Chicago White Sox in 1922.

External links

1899 births
1969 deaths
Baseball players from Connecticut
Chicago White Sox players
Colgate Raiders baseball players
People from Seymour, Connecticut
Valleyfield/Cap-de-la-Madeleine Madcaps players
Quebec Bulldogs (baseball) players
Pittsfield Hillies players
American expatriate baseball players in Canada